Energy brokers assist clients in procuring electric or natural gas from energy wholesalers/suppliers. Since electricity and natural gas are commodities, prices change daily with the market. It is challenging for most businesses without energy managers to obtain price comparisons from a variety of suppliers since prices must be compared on exactly the same day. In addition, the terms of the particular contract offered by the supplier influences the price that is quoted. An energy broker can provide a valuable service if they work with a large number of suppliers and can actually compile the sundry prices from suppliers. An important aspect of this consulting role is to assure that the client understands the differences between the contract offers. Under some State Laws they use the term "Suppliers" to refer to energy suppliers, brokers, and aggregators, however there are very important differences between them all.

Energy brokers do not own or distribute energy, nor are allowed to sell energy directly to you. They simply present the rates of a wholesaler, or supplier.

Product and services
Energy consultants offer a lot more than procuring energy contracts from a supplier. In the UK and Europe where there is a lot of legislation and increasing pressure for businesses and countries to do more to reduce their energy consumption a lot of services from brokers now help ensure businesses meet a lot of compliance and accreditation requirements such as the ESOS (energy saving opportunity scheme), ISO 50001, ISO 14001, Energy Performance Certificates and Display Energy Certificates.
Other services include helping companies reduce energy consumption with the aim of meeting national and international carbon emission standards. Services include, energy health checks, energy audits, carbon zero, carbon offsetting and energy saving consulting.

Additional services such as arranging a power purchase agreement, energy export contracts can be procured as well as energy monitoring and reporting technology and solutions are also offered by energy consultants.

Who do energy brokers serve?
In the USA, energy brokers can serve residential, commercial and government entities that reside in energy deregulated states. In the UK, and some countries in Europe, the entire market is deregulated.

Fees/Commission
Energy brokers typically do not charge up front fees to provide rates. If an entity purchases energy through a broker, the broker's fee or commission is usually included in the unit rate the customer pays. This is referred to as an uplift. Some brokers will charge a fixed fee for their consulting services.

Consulting

Not all energy brokers are consultants; However, the energy brokers who are also consultants will perform a more detailed analysis of a consumers' usage pattern in order to provide a custom rate, which typically results in more cost savings for the consumer. Typically, they do not need any more information than that of an energy broker, because they can pull usage information from the local utility company. There are some national energy brokers that use auditing teams to verify their client's invoices.

References

Business occupations
Energy
 Broker